Robert Craig McClure (born April 29, 1952) is an American former professional baseball player and coach. He played in Major League Baseball as a left-handed pitcher from 1975 to 1993, most notably as a member of the Milwaukee Brewers with whom he won the 1982 American League pennant. Following his playing career, he has served as a coach for several MLB teams.

Playing career

Kansas City Royals
McClure was born in Oakland, California, and attended Terra Nova High School in Pacifica, California, and College of San Mateo in San Mateo, California. He was drafted by the Los Angeles Dodgers in the third round of the January phase of the 1973 Major League Baseball draft, however chose not to sign. Instead, he signed with the Kansas City Royals, who selected him in the secondary phase of the draft that June, also in the third round.

The Royals used McClure as a starting pitcher his first professional season in the Pioneer League in 1973. He went 10–2 with a 2.11 earned run average for the Billings Mustangs. He started in 1974 as well, and was converted to a relief pitcher in 1975. He made his major league debut with the Royals on August 13, 1975 against the Baltimore Orioles, pitching one inning, striking out one and walking one. On September 23, he entered a ballgame at Kauffman Stadium against the Texas Rangers with one out and one on in the second inning. He pitched six scoreless innings to earn his first major league win.

Milwaukee Brewers
On December 6, 1976, the Milwaukee Brewers sent catcher Darrell Porter and pitcher Jim Colborn to the Kansas City Royals for Jamie Quirk, Jim Wohlford and a player to be named later. On March 15, 1977, McClure was sent to the Brewers to complete the deal.

With the Brewers, McClure led his team in saves in 1978 and 1980, then spent almost all of 1981 on the disabled list with arm problems. In 1982, he was moved to the starting rotation and had a 12–7 mark for the American League champion Brewers, but he returned to the bullpen after incumbent closer Rollie Fingers was unavailable for the postseason. In the 1982 World Series against the St. Louis Cardinals, McClure made five appearances, saving Games Four and Five, but he also had two losses, including a blown save in the decisive Game Seven.

Montreal Expos
Midseason 1986, he was traded to the Montreal Expos, going 2–5 with a 3.02 ERA his first season in the National League. The following season, his record improved to 6–1 out of the Montreal bullpen.

New York Mets
McClure was 1–3 with a 6.16 ERA when the Expos released him in July 1988. He signed with the New York Mets shortly afterwards, where he was reunited with his CSM teammate Keith Hernandez, with whom he also played Little League baseball when they were younger.

California Angels
After just one season with the Mets, he was released, and signed as a free agent with the California Angels for 1989. Despite going 8–1 in his first two seasons with the Angels, McClure pitched poorly in early 1991, and was released by the Angels in June.

St. Louis Cardinals
McClure signed with the St. Louis Cardinals for the remainder of the 1991 season, and remained with the Cards through 1992.

Coaching career

Colorado Rockies
Following his playing career, McClure worked as a pitching coach for the Colorado Rockies organization from 1999 through 2005, including four seasons at Triple-A Colorado Springs.

Kansas City Royals
For the 2006 season, new Royals manager Buddy Bell asked McClure to replace Guy Hansen as their new pitching coach. The Royals fired McClure from his pitching coach position following the 2011 season.

Boston Red Sox
In November 2011, the Boston Red Sox confirmed reports that they had hired McClure as a scout, roving minor league pitching instructor, and special assistant for player development. On December 21, 2011, McClure was promoted to pitching coach for Boston's major league team. He was fired from this position on August 20, 2012.

Philadelphia Phillies
On November 21, 2013, he was named to manager Ryne Sandberg's staff as the 2014 pitching coach of the Philadelphia Phillies, succeeding Rich Dubee.

Minnesota Twins
In January 2020, McClure was hired by the Twins to serve as their bullpen coach. However, it was subsequently announced that he was not cleared to join the Twins, following an evaluation of "the health histories of all staff members" during the COVID-19 pandemic.

References

External links

Baseball Almanac
Baseball Library

1952 births
Living people
American expatriate baseball players in Canada
Baseball coaches from California
Baseball players from Oakland, California
Billings Mustangs players
Boston Red Sox coaches
Burlington Bees players
California Angels players
Florida Marlins coaches
Florida Marlins players
Jacksonville Suns players
Kansas City Royals coaches
Kansas City Royals players
Major League Baseball bullpen coaches
Major League Baseball pitchers
Major League Baseball pitching coaches
Milwaukee Brewers players
Montreal Expos players
New York Mets players
Omaha Royals players
Palm Springs Angels players
Philadelphia Phillies coaches
Quad Cities Cubs players
San Mateo Bulldogs baseball players
St. Louis Cardinals players